Nature Reviews Microbiology is a monthly peer-reviewed review journal published by Nature Portfolio. It was established in 2003. The journal publishes reviews and perspectives on microbiology, bridging fundamental research and its clinical, industrial, and environmental applications. The editor-in-chief is Ashley York.

Abstracting and indexing
This journal is indexed and abstracted by the following databases:
BIOSIS Previews
Current Contents/Life Sciences 
Science Citation Index
Medline
PubMed
Index Medicus

Other services that index this journal are: 
 Scopus , Academic Search Premier , Biotechnology Research Abstracts , CAB Abstracts , Chemical Abstracts Service, and EMBASE.

According to the Journal Citation Reports, the journal has a 2021 impact factor of 78.297, ranking it 2nd out of 136 journals in the category "Microbiology".

References

External links 
 

Nature Research academic journals
Publications established in 2003
Microbiology journals
English-language journals
Monthly journals
Review journals